Strathmore may refer to:

Organizations 
 Strathmore (Maryland), an arts foundation in North Bethesda, U.S.
 Strathmore School, in Nairobi, Kenya
 Strathmore University, in Nairobi, Kenya
 Strathmore Business School
 Strathmore Law School

Places

Australia
 Strathmore, Queensland
 Strathmore Station, near Croydon in Queensland, Australia
 Strathmore Homestead, near Collinsville in Queensland, Australia
 Strathmore, Victoria, a suburb of Melbourne, Australia
 Strathmore railway station, Essendon, Melbourne, Australia

Scotland
 Strathmore (ward), Perth and Kinross
 Strathmore, Sutherland, a valley in northern Scotland
 Valley of Strathmore, in east central Scotland

United States
 Strathmore, California
 Strathmore, New Jersey
 Strathmore, New York
 Strathmore, Syracuse, New York

Other places
 Strathmore, Alberta, Canada
 Strathmore (D.J. Murray) Airport
 Strathmore (Appleton Field) Aerodrome
 Strathmore (Killiney), a mansion in Dún Laoghaire–Rathdown, Ireland
 Strathmore, New Zealand
 Strathmore Park, or Strathmore, a suburb of Wellington, New Zealand

Sport
 Strathmore F.C. (Arbroath), a former football club in Scotland
 Strathmore F.C. (Dundee), a former football club in Scotland
 Strathmore Football Club, an Australian rules football club 
 Strathmore RFC, a rugby union club in Forfar, Scotland

Other uses 
 Strathmore (play), an 1849 play by 	John Westland Marston
 RMS Strathmore, a British ship 1935–1969
 Strathmore Mineral Water, produced by A.G. Barr
 Trevor Strathmore, a character in the novel Digital Fortress

See also

 Strath, a large valley
 Earl of Strathmore and Kinghorne, a title in the Peerage of Scotland and the Peerage of the UK